Jamie Hughes (born 27 February 1986) is an English professional darts player. He competes for the Professional Darts Corporation.

Career

2014–2015
Hughes broke out in 2014 by entering the world's top ten and reaching the final of the prestigious Winmau World Masters. He defeated Alan Norris 3–2 in the quarter-finals from 2–0 down, and Martin Adams 6–5 in the semi-finals from 5–2 down, also surviving ten match darts in the ninth set. Hughes was eventually beaten 7–3 by Martin Phillips having led 2–0 and thrown for the third set. In December of that year, Hughes won the prestigious Zuiderduin Masters on his first appearance at the event, surviving six match darts in the semi-final against Tony O'Shea before beating Gary Robson 5–0 in the final, losing only three legs in the whole match.

Hughes made his World Championship debut at the 2015 BDO World Darts Championship as the number 10 seed. He beat Michel van der Horst in the first round before losing in the second round to his good friend Glen Durrant. Hughes then went onto to make the 2015 BDO World Trophy as fifth seed, however he was surprisingly beaten 7–4 by Stefaan Deprez in the last 16. Later on in the year Hughes reached the Quarter-finals of the 2015 World Masters but was surprisingly beaten by Thomas Junghans. Hughes failed to defend his previous Zuiderduin Masters finals, been knocked out of the competition in the group stage.

2016–2018
Hughes was fourth seed going into the 2016 BDO World Darts Championship, beating Ross Montgomery, Madars Razma and fifth seed Wesley Harms to reach the semi finals for the first time. He was defeated 6–1 by eventual winner Scott Waites, however reaching the semi-finals meant he automatically qualified for the 2017 tournament. Hughes achieved his best ever World Trophy result when he reached the Semi-finals, where he was defeated 11–9 to eventual winner Darryl Fitton. Hughes qualified for the PDC event the Grand Slam of Darts for the first time due to his ranking. He beat Dave Chisnall and James Wilson to finish top of his group. He was beaten 10–9 by Chris Dobey in the last 16. Hughes reached the Semi-finals of the 2016 World Masters but was beaten by eventual winner Glen Durrant. In the 2016 Zuiderduin Masters he reached the final, before once again being beaten by Glen Durrant.

In the 2017 BDO World Darts Championship Hughes reached the semi-finals for the second year in a row before been beaten 6–1 by eventual winner Glen Durrant.

In the 2018 BDO World Darts Championship Hughes lost to German debutant Michael Unterbuchner 3–2 in the first round.

PDC

Hughes switched to the PDC following the 2018 BDO World Darts Championship, entering the 2018 PDC Q-School. He was unable to win a Tour Card, but finished 12th on the Challenge Tour Order of Merit, winning one event and making another semi-final. 2018 also saw Hughes make the last 32 of the UK Open, qualify for his first European Tour event, the 2018 European Darts Open, and play in the last four Players Championship events due to his Challenge Tour success. He picked up £3,500 in these tournaments, setting him up well for a return to Q-School in 2019.

A fantastic performance on the opening day in Wigan including several very high averages meant Hughes won his PDC Tour Card for the first time on the very first day of 2019 UK Q-School, beating Kirk Shepherd 5–1.

Hughes was to win his first PDC title in June, claiming the Czech Darts Open in Prague with an 8–3 win over Stephen Bunting, after knocking out the number 14 seed Simon Whitlock in the semi final,  qualifying him for the World Matchplay as a result.

World Championship results

BDO
 2015: Second round (lost to Glen Durrant 1–4)
 2016: Semi-finals (lost to Scott Waites 1–6)
 2017: Semi-finals (lost to Glen Durrant 1–6)
 2018: First round  (lost to Michael Unterbuchner 2–3)

PDC
 2020: First round (lost to Zoran Lerchbacher 2–3)
 2021: Second round (lost to Adam Hunt 0–3)
 2022: First round (lost to Raymond Smith 1–3)
 2023: First round (lost to Jimmy Hendriks 1–3)

Performance timeline

PDC European Tour

References

External links

1986 births
Living people
English darts players
British Darts Organisation players
Professional Darts Corporation current tour card holders
Sportspeople from Tipton
PDC ranking title winners